The Madness Fall Tour was the fourth concert tour and first arena tour by Canadian singer the Weeknd, in support of his second studio album Beauty Behind the Madness (2015). The tour was announced on August 20, 2015 with 20 dates, and began on November 3, 2015, in Toronto at the Air Canada Centre and concluded on December 19, 2015, in Miami at the American Airlines Arena.

Commercial reception 
In January 2016, the tour placed at number 43 on Pollstars "2015 Year-End Top 200 North American Tours" list, grossing $24.3 million from 23 shows with a total attendance of 318,104.

Set list
This set list is representative of the show on November 16, 2015, in New York City. It is not representative of all concerts for the duration of the tour.

 "Real Life"
 "Losers"
 "Acquainted"
 "Often"
 "High for This"
 "The Party"
 "King of the Fall"
 "Crew Love"
 "Or Nah" 
 "Professional"
 "The Morning"
 "House of Balloons" / "Glass Table Girls"
 "Tell Your Friends"
 "The Birds Part 1″
 "Shameless"
 "Earned It"
 "Dark Times"
 "As You Are"
 "Angel"
 "Dirty Diana"  / "In the Night"
 "Can't Feel My Face"
 "Prisoner"
 "The Hills"Encore'
  "Wicked Games"

Shows

References

External links 
 The Weeknd official website
 

2015 concert tours
Concert tours of North America
The Weeknd concert tours